The Hottest Show on Earth Tour was a concert tour by Kiss in support of their 19th studio album, Sonic Boom. It is essentially the North American leg of the Sonic Boom Over Europe Tour, itself a continuation of the Kiss Alive/35 World Tour that started in 2008. Kiss also played in Mexico for the first time since 2004. The tour featured both arena and amphitheater shows throughout the United States, plus Canada, and was produced by Live Nation. As with previous concert tours, live recordings of every show were sold at the venue by SymfyLive.

Kiss also stated that one dollar from each ticket sold would be donated to the United States Armed Forces to benefit the Wounded Warriors Project. Kiss also added more shows to the tour in Puerto Rico, Houston, and Hollywood, Florida. Kiss announced seven shows to be added to the tour as a small Japanese tour however these shows have now been postponed to later in the year.

The opening bands for the concert were The Academy Is..., Bad City, The Envy and a local act for every city, winner of a contest held by Guitar Center.

In the tour program for the band's final tour, Stanley reflected on the tour:

Set list 
According to kissonline.com, the official website of the band, Kiss will perform such classics as "Detroit Rock City" and "Rock and Roll All Nite" as well as hits that they haven't played in the US in many years. The set list is almost identical to the previous European tour, including three songs from Sonic Boom and the song "Crazy Crazy Nights", which hasn't been played live (except during their last European tour) since 1990. The setlist below started the tour in Cheyenne, Wyoming.

"Modern Day Delilah"
"Cold Gin"
"Let Me Go, Rock 'n' Roll"
"Firehouse" (Gene breathes fire)
"Say Yeah"
"Deuce"
"Crazy Crazy Nights"
"Calling Dr. Love"
"Shock Me" (Tommy and Eric jamming together)
"I'm an Animal"
"100,000 Years"
"I Love It Loud" (Gene spits blood and flies)
"Love Gun"
"Black Diamond" (Paul solo and excerpt from "Whole Lotta Love" before "Black Diamond")
"Detroit Rock City"

Encore
"Beth"
"Lick It Up" (with bridge from "Won't Get Fooled Again")
"Shout It Out Loud"
"I Was Made for Lovin' You" (Paul flies to B-Stage)
"God Gave Rock 'N' Roll to You II"
"Rock and Roll All Nite"

Lost Cities Tour set list 

"Modern Day Delilah"
"Cold Gin"
"Let Me Go, Rock 'n' Roll"
"Firehouse" (Gene breathes fire)
"Say Yeah"
"Deuce"
"Do You Love Me"
"Calling Dr. Love"
"Shock Me" (Tommy and Eric jamming together)
"I Love It Loud"
"Love Gun"
"God of Thunder" (Gene spits blood)
"Black Diamond" (Paul solo and excerpt from "Stairway to Heaven" before "Black Diamond")
"Detroit Rock City"

Encore
"Beth"
"Lick It Up" (with bridge from "Won't Get Fooled Again")
"Shout It Out Loud"
"Rock and Roll All Nite"

Tour dates 

 Beginning of the Lost Cities Tour

Personnel

Kiss
 Paul Stanley – vocals, rhythm guitar
 Gene Simmons – vocals, bass
 Tommy Thayer – lead guitar, vocals
 Eric Singer – drums, vocals

References 

2010 concert tours
2011 concert tours
Kiss (band) concert tours